There are over 20,000 Grade II* listed buildings in England. This page is a list of these buildings in the district of Telford and Wrekin in Shropshire.

Telford and Wrekin

|}

Notes

External links

 
Telford and Wrekin
Telford and Wrekin